Saban's Around the World in Eighty Dreams is a French animated series that first premiered on Canal+ on November 13, 1992, and later aired on TF1 in December 1993.

A co-production between Saban International Paris and TF1, with the participation of Canal+ and the CNC, the series focuses on Carlos (Based on Carlos Dolto, a French singer and celebrity) and his parrot Oscar, and three adopted children who live on Carlos' own tropical Island. Carlos loves to tell the children stories about how he met world famous important figures in history in spite of the children's disbelief. With the help of Grandma Tadpole, who lives on one of the beaches of the island, he travels back in time together with the children in order to prove to them that he is right. Carlos has the ability to transform into an ox when the group is in trouble.

Ownership of the series passed to Disney in 2001 when Disney acquired Fox Kids Worldwide, which also includes Saban Entertainment. The series is not available on Disney+.

Characters 
 Carlos (voiced by himself in the French version, and Mark Camacho in the English dub)
 Mariana/Marianne (voiced by Sylvie Jacob in the French version, and Patricia Rodriguez in the English dub)
 Oscar (voiced by Gérard Surugue in the French version, and Rick Jones in the English dub)
 Mamie Têtard/Grandma Tadpole (voiced by Évelyne Grandjean in the French version, and Rick Jones in the English dub)
 Saitout/Koki (voiced by Adrien Antoine in the French version, and Pauline Little in the English dub)
 A.J. (voiced by Sonja Ball in the English dub)

International Airings
In 1993, the show was broadcast in the United States in first-run syndication in the early 1990s as part of Bohbot Entertainment's "Amazin' Adventures" package.

Video Game
In 1994, a video game based on the series was released in France by Microïds for the Atari ST, Amiga, and MS-DOS. It was a platforming game.

References

External links
 
  Around the World in Eighty Dreams in Planete-Jeunesse

French children's animated fantasy television series
1990s French animated television series
1992 French television series debuts
1993 French television series endings
Canal+ original programming
Television series by Saban Entertainment